The 1999 IBAF Intercontinental Cup was held in Australia from 3 to 14 November 1999. Eight countries contested the tournament, and has been the only Intercontinental Cup hosted in the Southern Hemisphere. The eight participating countries were Cuba, Australia, Italy, the Netherlands, Japan, South Korea, United States and Chinese Taipei. The tournament was sanctioned by the International Baseball Federation.

The Cup was perhaps the brightest moment in the history of the Australia national baseball team, as they stunned the Cuba national baseball team in the finals, winning the game 4–3. The MVP of the tournament was also Australian MLB player and former All-Star, Dave Nilsson.

All-Star team
  C: Dave Nilsson, Australia
 1B: Dan Held, USA
 2B: Oscar Macías, Cuba
 SS: Danel Castro, Cuba
 3B: Akinori Iwamura, Japan
 OF: Yuan-Chia Chen, Chinese Taipei
 OF: Yobal Dueñas, Cuba
 OF: Claudio Liverziani, Italy
 DH: Michael Moyle, Australia
 P: Faustino Corrales, Cuba
 P: Adrian Meagher, Australia

Intercontinental Cup (baseball)
Intercontinental Cup
1999
Intercontinental Cup
Intercontinental Cup